Anisochilus is a genus in the family Lamiaceae, commonly called as Kapuri  first described in 1830. It is native to China, the Indian Subcontinent, and Indochina. Has healing properties that deal with treatment for ailments known as gastric ulcer and helps with dermis issues. Anisochilus also has active properties such as camphor, leutiolin, and apigenin. A new hygrine-like compound has been found within the DNA of this plant.

Species
 Anisochilus adenanthus Dalzell & A.Gibson - southern India
 Anisochilus argenteus Gamble - southern India
 Anisochilus cambodianus Murata - Thailand, Cambodia
 Anisochilus carnosus (L.f.) Wall. - India, Sri Lanka, Nepal, Himalayas, Bhutan, Assam, Myanmar, Thailand
 Anisochilus dysophylloides Benth. - Shervarayan Hills in Tamil Nadu
 Anisochilus harmandii Doan ex Suddee & A.J.Paton - Thailand, Laos, Cambodia
 Anisochilus mitis R.A.Clement - eastern Himalayas
 Anisochilus pallidus Wall. - Yunnan, India, Assam, Bangladesh, Laos, Myanmar, Thailand, Vietnam
 Anisochilus paniculatus Benth. - southern India
 Anisochilus plantagineus Hook.f. - southern India
 Anisochilus polystachys Benth. - Nepal, Bhutan, Assam, Bangladesh, eastern Himalayas
 Anisochilus robustus Hook.f. - southern India
 Anisochilus scaber Benth. - southern India
 Anisochilus siamensis Ridl. - Thailand
 Anisochilus suffruticosus Wight - southern India
 Anisochilus velutinus Trimen - Sri Lanka
 Anisochilus wightii Hook.f. - southern India

References

Lamiaceae
Lamiaceae genera